Dawson Francis "Tiny" Graham (September 9, 1892 – December 29, 1962) was a Major League Baseball first baseman who played for the Cincinnati Reds in .

External links

Cincinnati Reds players
1892 births
1962 deaths
Baseball players from Tennessee
People from Nashville, Tennessee
Cleveland Counts players
Morristown Jobbers players
Roanoke Tigers players
Toronto Maple Leafs (International League) players
Chattanooga Lookouts players
Nashville Vols players
Oklahoma City Indians players